Mary Frances Gifford (December 7, 1920 – January 22, 1994) was an American actress who played leads and supporting roles in many 1930s and 1940s movies.

Early years
Gifford was born and raised in Long Beach, California, and at the age of 16, applied to UCLA School of Law with no intention of pursuing an acting career.  With a friend, she visited the studios of Samuel Goldwyn to watch a film being made, and while there, was spotted by a talent scout, who brought her to the attention of Goldwyn, who signed her to an acting contract.

Career

After only receiving minor roles, Gifford moved to RKO, where she was cast in several uncredited supporting roles in films of the late 1930s, including Stage Door (1937) starring Katharine Hepburn and Ginger Rogers.

Gifford married actor James Dunn on Christmas Day 1937. In 1939, she landed her first leading role in the low-budget Mercy Plane, opposite her husband.  A planned retirement was interrupted briefly when she played another uncredited role in James Stewart's break-out film Mr. Smith Goes to Washington (1939).

Gifford played several more minor roles before she was, in 1941, lent to Republic Pictures and cast in the role which would arguably produce her most enduring fame: as the semiclad Nyoka in Jungle Girl, a 15-chapter movie serial, based very loosely on the novel by Edgar Rice Burroughs. The role was the first time since Pearl White in the silent era that an actress had played the lead in the movie serial genre.

The following year, Republic made a sequel Perils of Nyoka, but Gifford was no longer available and the heroine's part was played by Kay Aldridge.  In the Walt Disney feature The Reluctant Dragon (1941), Gifford had a leading role as Doris, a studio artist.

With Gifford's film career gaining momentum and Dunn's on the decline, partly due to his struggles with alcoholism, the marriage had failed by 1942. She left RKO for Paramount Pictures, where she acted in several films, including The Glass Key (1942) in which she portrayed the same small role of "Nurse" that Ann Sheridan had played in the 1935 original version, albeit expanded in the remake. In 1943, she made another jungle movie, costarring with Johnny Weissmuller in Tarzan Triumphs at RKO. That year, she also left Paramount and moved to the prestigious Metro-Goldwyn-Mayer studio with the sponsorship of an MGM executive.

At MGM, she had more success, playing leading roles in such films as Our Vines Have Tender Grapes (1945) opposite Edward G. Robinson and She Went to the Races (1945), receiving billing over Ava Gardner, followed by the more notable  The Arnelo Affair (1947). Gifford also played in supporting roles, including Thrill of a Romance (1945) with Esther Williams, and Luxury Liner (1948) with Jane Powell.

Car accident and later years
On December 31, 1947, Gifford was almost killed in a car accident at age 27 in which she received severe head injuries, resulting in a drastic change in her personality. She "sustained a fractured and cut nose." A film executive who was with her in the car had a compound fracture of a leg. The event sidelined her career and caused a sharp decline in her health. She began to lose confidence in her abilities and found it difficult to come back to films. 

Losing her contract with MGM, she attempted a comeback in two early 1950s films, Frank Capra's Riding High (1950) with Bing Crosby and Sky Commando (1953) with Dan Duryea. During the 1950s, her mental and physical health declined to the point where she was placed into Camarillo State Mental Hospital in 1958. She spent almost the entire next 25 years in and out of various institutions.

In 1983, Richard S. Fisher, a journalist for a film magazine, tracked Gifford down, who had lately been volunteering at the Pasadena, California, City Library, having apparently recovered. She spent her final years in quiet obscurity and died of emphysema in a convalescent center in Pasadena at the age of 73. Her cremains are interred at Holy Cross Cemetery in Culver City, California.

Gifford was of the Roman Catholic faith and a lifelong Democrat who supported Adlai Stevenson's campaign during the 1952 presidential election.

Recognition
In 1941, Gifford was selected as "the ideal Pan-American girl" by 200 chapters of the Pan-American League on college campuses across the United States.

Partial filmography

New Faces of 1937 (1937) - Showgirl
The Big Shot (1937) - Bertram's Secretary (uncredited)
Stage Door (1937) - Mary McGuire (uncredited)
Woman Chases Man (1937)
There Goes the Groom (1937) - Minor Role (uncredited)
Living on Love (1937) - Bus Passenger (uncredited)
Bringing Up Baby (1938) - Minor Role (uncredited)
Night Spot (1938) - Nightclub Patron (uncredited)
Maid's Night Out (1938) - Ticket Seller - Octopus Concession (uncredited)
Having a Wonderful Time (1938) - Salesgirl (uncredited)
Sky Giant (1938) - Stewardess (uncredited)
Mr. Smith Goes to Washington (1939) - Hopper Girl (uncredited)
Mercy Plane (1939) - Brenda Gordon
Forty Little Mothers (1940) - Granville Girl (uncredited)
Hold That Woman! (1940) - Mary Mulvaney - aka Mary Parker
The Reluctant Dragon (1941) - Doris (Studio Artist)
Border Vigilantes (1941) - Helen Forbes
West Point Widow (1941) - Daphne
Jungle Girl (1941, Serial) - Nyoka Meredith
Louisiana Purchase (1941) - Salesgirl (uncredited)
The Remarkable Andrew (1942) - Miss Halsey
Tombstone, the Town Too Tough to Die (1942) - Ruth Grant
Beyond the Blue Horizon (1942) - Charlotte (uncredited)
The Glass Key (1942) - Nurse
My Heart Belongs to Daddy (1942) - Grace Saunders
Star Spangled Rhythm (1942) - Herself (uncredited)
American Empire (1942) - Abigail 'Abby' Taylor
Tarzan Triumphs (1943) - Zandra
Henry Aldrich Gets Glamour (1943) - Hilary Dane
Cry 'Havoc' (1943) - Helen Domeret
Marriage Is a Private Affair (1944) - Sissy Mortimer
Thrill of a Romance (1945) - Maude Bancroft
Our Vines Have Tender Grapes (1945) - Viola Johnson
She Went to the Races (1945) - Dr. Ann Wotters
Little Mister Jim (1946) - Jean Tukker
The Arnelo Affair (1947) - Anne Parkson
Luxury Liner (1948) - Laura Dene
Riding High (1950) - Margaret Higgins
Sky Commando (1953) - Jo McWethy

References

Notes

Bibliography

 Jewell, Richard B. and Vernon Harbin. The RKO Story. London: Octopus Books, 1982. .
 Maltin, Leonard. Leonard Maltin's Movie Encyclopedia. New York: Dutton, 1994. .
 McClelland, Doug. The Golden Age of B Movies. New York: Bonanza Books, 1978. .
 Weiss, Ken and Ed Goodgold. To be Continued ...: A Complete Guide to Motion Picture Serials. New York: Bonanza Books, 1973. .

External links
 

Frances Gifford bio
Allmovie bio
 
 
Obituary from The New York Times

1920 births
1994 deaths
20th-century American actresses
American film actresses
American television actresses
Deaths from emphysema
Metro-Goldwyn-Mayer contract players
Actresses from Long Beach, California
Paramount Pictures contract players
Burials at Holy Cross Cemetery, Culver City
California Democrats
American Roman Catholics
American librarians
American women librarians